The Ontario Science Centre, formally the Centennial Museum of Science and Technology, is a science museum in Toronto, Ontario, Canada. It is built down the side of a wooded ravine formed by one branch of the Don River located in Flemingdon Park.

History
Planning for the Science Centre started in 1961 during Toronto's massive expansion of the late 1950s and 1960s. In 1964, Toronto architect Raymond Moriyama was hired to design the site. Construction started in 1966 with plans to open the "Centennial Centre of Science and Technology" as part of the Canadian Centennial celebrations in 1967. However construction was not completed in 1967, and the Science Centre did not open to the public until two years later, on September 26, 1969.

The buildings and design were part of a broader change in Canadian architecture, and remain an example of the brutalist style.

When it first opened, the Science Centre was a pioneer for its hands-on approach to science, along with San Francisco's Exploratorium and the Michigan Science Center in Detroit. Unlike a traditional museum, where exhibits are for viewing only, the majority of the exhibits at the Science Centre were interactive, while many others were live demonstrations (e.g. metalworking). The Communications room contained a number of computerized displays, including a very popular tic-tac-toe game, run on a PDP-11 minicomputer.

In 1990, it was revealed the Ontario Science Centre had signed a contract with Oman to design a children's museum. The Ontario Science Centre had agreed to boycott Israeli goods and services while under contract. The Ontario Science Centre later amended the contract to specify that all goods sold to Oman would be produced in North America. The centre's Director General Mark Abbott was later fired for knowingly signing the original contract.

In 2001 the Centre embarked on a capital project called "Agents of Change", which focused on innovation and renewed about 85 per cent of the Centre's public space, including the creation of seven new experience areas. The Centre received $47.5 million in contributions from the government of Ontario, private sector companies, and individuals. The Agents of Change transformation was completed 2007, culminating with the opening of the Weston Family Innovation Centre and the Teluscape plaza.

In response to the COVID-19 pandemic in Ontario, the Science Centre received $500,000 from the Government of Canada to promote COVID-19 vaccine uptake among children and their families.

Grounds

Plaza
Lotic Meander by Stacey Levy is an outdoor installation in polished and blasted granite and cast glass set into the solar terrace of the Ontario Science Centre. The work depicts the patterns of water as it moves through a stream bed. In 2007, the Ontario Science Centre unveiled the Teluscape Exploration Plaza, providing several interactive exhibits adjacent to the science centre's exterior main entrance.

FUNtain Aquatic Play

As originally built, the Science Centre had a large fountain area directly in front of the entranceway, located to create a traffic roundabout. The original water fountain has been rejuvenated to provide a more welcoming and accessible entrance to the Science Centre.  The new plaza, named "Teluscape", was designed by Reich + Petch Architects and EDA Collaborative. It opened to the public on September 20, 2006, and is accessible 24 hours a day.

The new fountain is also a hydraulophone designed by installation artist Steve Mann. It is a hydraulic-action pipe organ which can be played by anyone walking into the space. Blocking the flow of any one of the 57 water jets in the fountain forces the water across to a corresponding organ pipe, where it makes a loud sound as the water is forced out through the speaking mouth of the pipe. The lowest 12 notes in each pipe division of the organ are visible as pipes arranged in a circle. The North Division consists of stopped hydrapasons (similar to diapasons but running on water rather than air), whereas the South Division pipes are open at both ends (sound emerges from the ends rather than from a mouth as with the North pipes).  The North organ console consists of 12 water jets, whereas the south console consists of 45 water jets.

Air is supplied from three Ingersol Rand four-cylinder air compressors, each having a  motor. Since the instrument runs on both air and water, it may be regarded as a hybrid hydraulophone and pneumatophone, but because it is played by blocking water jets rather than air holes, it is principally a hydraulophone.

The fountain must be shut down and drained to avoid freezing damage during the cold season. On November 21, 2007, the aquatic play facility was temporarily switched from water operation to air operation, effectively becoming perhaps one of the first pneumatic-play facilities, where visitors can frolic in a fountain of air jets. In this mode of operation, the fountain becomes a wind instrument. The hydraulophone may not be operational during the winter months.

Building
Designed in the early 1960s, the original buildings incorporate Brutalist designs. The building complex is made up of three main buildings connected by a series of bridges and escalators, follows the natural contours of the Don River ravine, into which the Centre descends. Ontario's only IMAX Dome theatre opened in 1996.

The Great Hall is an event venue at the Ontario Science Centre and is home to Cloud, a massive, computer-controlled kinetic sculpture by Toronto installation artist David Rokeby, which consists of an array of blue and transparent squares that rotate in various ways to simulate the three states of matter: solid, liquid and gas.

For most of the time since opening in 1969, the Science Centre has hosted a demonstration amateur radio station. Formerly located in the Hall of Space, the station is now located on Level 4 of the Centre, next to the elevator. The station has the call sign "VE3OSC", and licensed amateur radio operators volunteer there daily from 10 am to 3 pm.

Exhibitions
The Science Centre has hosted a number of traveling exhibits since its opening. In 1982, the exhibition China: 7,000 Years of Discovery broke all attendance records and attracted more than 1.5 million visitors.

In 2003, the Strange Matter exhibition opened, and the Body Worlds 2 exhibition attracted almost half a million visitors over five months when it came to the Centre in 2005. The exhibition Facing Mars ran in 2008. The Centre hosted Harry Potter: The Exhibition, a collection of props from the film series in 2010. Leonardo da Vinci's Workshop (2011) featured physical models of da Vinci's inventions, built from drawings in his Codices. It also included interactive touch-screen digital reproductions of his Codices, the Mona Lisa and The Last Supper. Circus: The Exhibition ran in 2012. Game On 2.0, a video game history exhibition, ran March 9 to September 2, 2013.

In June 2014, the Centre welcomed The Science of Rock 'N' Roll, which explores how advances in science and technology have revolutionized music. The exhibition features eight areas that comprise different interactive components, historical artifacts, informational walls, documentary videos and more. The Science of Rock 'N' Roll was followed by In Knowledge We Trust, which ran October 4 to December 7, 2014, and explored the role trust plays in making us willing to share or use the knowledge we receive.

During summer 2015, the Centre hosted the MythBusters: The Explosive Exhibition, based on the popular television series MythBusters. On June 4, 2016, the Centre hosted a one-day exhibit promoting the Nintendo 3DS game Kirby: Planet Robobot, which also featured activities pertaining to the Kirby video game series and a visit by a performer in a full Kirby costume. In 2017, to celebrate the 150th anniversary of Canada, the Centre opened the exhibition Canada 150: Discovery Way, featuring Canadian stories behind transformational inventions and innovations.

Permanent galleries and exhibits
The science centre has several hundred interactive and passive permanent exhibits, featuring geology, the science of nature (in the west wing), astronomical science, how to play music and technology in the south wing, human anatomy, communication and bias, and some miscellaneous artifacts of science.

A Question of Truth
A Question of Truth is an exhibit that explores the methodologies, biases, and beliefs of scientific research. The exhibit provides visitors an opportunity to test controversial theories.

AstraZeneca Human Edge
The AstraZeneca Human Edge replaced the original human anatomy gallery, opened in December 2013 with sponsorship from AstraZeneca. In addition to detailing anatomy, the exhibit explores the possibilities of the human body with activities to simulate the experiences of adventure-seekers, elite athletes, and extreme-sports enthusiasts. There are more than 80 exhibits in the hall, which were all developed and built by the Science Centre's staff with input from more than 120 neuroscience, physiology, bio-mechanics and sports medicine experts. The exhibit also features a climbing wall.

Cohon Family Nature Escape

The Cohon Family Nature Escape is an outdoor exhibit, situated within the Don River Valley to the back of the science centre. The exhibit features a giant Baltimore oriole nest, concrete wall canvas for moss graffiti, and a slide made from a fallen 125-year-old eastern white pine.

Forest Lane
Forest lane houses a number of trees and tree trunks from across Canada. The exhibit includes a 464-year-old Douglas fir, with markings on its growth rings denoting notable world events during the tree's lifetime.

KidSpark
KidSpark is a designated space for children eight and under to explore and learn through play. The exhibition was opened in 2003. The exhibition also has a rolling ball machine built by George Rhoads, and a music studio.

Living Earth
The Living Earth hosts simulated environments around the world, including rainforests, coral reefs, and caves. It was opened in 1993.

Science Arcade
The Science Arcade is amongst the oldest exhibits at the science centre, having been a permanent fixture in the building since its opening in 1969. The Science Arcade houses a number of "arcade-styled" games.

Space Hall and the Planetarium

The Space Hall was refurbished in the late 2000s and features meteorites from Mars and one of the few Moon rocks on public display in Canada. The Ontario Science Centre also holds Toronto's only operating public planetarium, since McLaughlin Planetarium was closed in 1995.

Weston Family Innovation Centre
The Weston Family Innovation Centre is an exhibit designed to encourage experimentation, and features exhibits that allow visitors to prototype a new type of shoe, and test their aviation abilities. The Weston Family Innovation Centre houses Pipe Dreams by Bruce Shapiro, a bubble art installation.

Science School
The Ontario Science Centre Science School (OSCSS) offers grade 12 University Preparation courses in STEM subjects: physics, biology, chemistry, calculus, and advanced functions. All students also complete an interdisciplinary studies credit in science communication while enrolled with the OSCSS. The credits are issued by either the Toronto District School Board or the Toronto Catholic District School Board, which also fund the program so it is available at no cost to students from anywhere in Ontario. While at the Science Centre, students earn practicum hours through volunteering and interacting with visitors.

Governance 
As an Agency of the Government of Ontario, the Ontario Science Centre is overseen by Trustees appointed by the Lieutenant Governor in Council, who selects not fewer than sixteen and not more than twenty-six trustees, and designates one of them as chair and another as vice-chair.  Meetings are held four times a year, and Trustees serve for a term not exceeding three years but may be reappointed for one or more terms.

Affiliations
The Ontario Science Centre is affiliated with the Canadian Museums Association (CMA), Canadian Heritage Information Network (CHIN), and Virtual Museum of Canada. The Ontario Science Centre is a member of the international Association of Science-Technology Centers (ASTC).

Cultural references
Ontario Science Centre was used by David Cronenberg as a location for his 1970 film Crimes of the Future.

Media
Ontario Science Centre was featured on the Rick Mercer Report in 2016. In his CBC news satire program, Rick Mercer visited numerous scientists' exhibits, took part in a wildlife conservation show, and partook in a psychological fear study during a workshop there.

References

External links

Ontario Science Centre homepage
Opening of Teluscape, 2006 Sept. 20th, including audiovisual recording of the water pipe organ
How to play in/on the Science Centre's South fountain
"Ontario Science Centre", part of Centennial Ontario, online exhibit on Archives of Ontario website

Brutalist architecture in Canada
Crown corporations of Ontario
Museums in Toronto
North York
Science museums in Canada
Raymond Moriyama buildings
IMAX venues
Museums established in 1969
Science and technology in Toronto
Buildings and structures completed in 1969
Science centers
Association of Science-Technology Centers member institutions
Amateur radio
1969 establishments in Ontario